Ustye is a rural locality (a village) in Andomskoye Rural Settlement, Vytegorsky District, Vologda Oblast, Russia. The population was 5 as of 2002.

Geography 
Ustye is located 29 km north of Vytegra (the district's administrative centre) by road. Shchekino is the nearest rural locality.

References 

Rural localities in Vytegorsky District